The Uruguay national rugby league team (Spanish: rugby league equipo nacional de Uruguay), nicknamed Gauchos Uruguayos (English: Uruguayan Gaucho), represents Uruguay in rugby league and made their debut at the first Latino Sevens on 17 October 2015.

History

Uruguay has played in two international rugby league matches, suffering loses against Hungry and El Salvador. They are currently ranked 47th in the world.

Current squad
The following is the current Uruguayan squad: 

 Angel Morrison III (c)
 Eric Rendo
 Josh Gadea-Hellyer
 Niko Cama
 Matt Cama
 Steven Clarke
 Gabriel Papa
 Julio Toledo
 Michael Leon
 Matty Booth
 Pablo Florentin
 Andres Rossini
 Javier Britos
 Noah Cama
 Luke Morrissey
 Kevin Clarke
 Kristofer Viera
 Diego Papa
 Nico Papa
 Ryan Kungl
 Gabriel Hernandez

Record

Below is table of the representative rugby league matches played by Uruguay at test level up until 14 June 2019:

References

South American national rugby league teams
R
National rugby league teams